Jeffrey Allen (born July 1, 1958) is a former American and Canadian football defensive back. He was drafted in the eight round (212th overall) in the 1980 NFL draft by the Miami Dolphins. He played college football at UC Davis. He also played for the San Diego Chargers, and San Francisco 49ers in the National Football League (NFL), as well as one game for the Toronto Argonauts in the Canadian Football League (CFL). He went on to appear in 25 career NFL games, while making nine starts.

Early career
Allen played college football at the University of California, Davis for the Aggies. In his final year with the Aggies (1980), he was awarded the Colby E. "Babe" Slater Award, which is awarded to the male athlete of the year.

Professional career
Allen was selected by the Miami Dolphins in the eighth round (212th overall) of the 1980 NFL Draft. In his rookie season, Allen played in all 16 regular season games for the Dolphins, where he was used primarily as a cornerback. He remained on the team through the off-season but was waived in mid-August.

The Toronto Argonauts were struggling heavily by August 1981 after losing eight consecutive games. Along with five other cut NFL players, Allen was signed in an attempt to improve the team. Allen and Elbert Roberts were expected to replace Marcellus Greene and Hank Williams. The Argonauts instead started Allen at safety for his CFL debut against the Calgary Stampeders on September 7, 1981. He was released the following week after starting only one game for the Argonauts. The Argonauts later re-signed Allen and traded him to the BC Lions for running back Calvin Murray, although Allen played no games for the Lions.

Before the 1982 season, the San Diego Chargers signed Allen. He played in the season opener against the Kansas City Chiefs. The secondary unit was praised for allowing only 3 points despite fielding two new starters, Allen and Andre Young. He went on to start in nine regular season games with the Chargers. Allen intercepted a pass from Terry Bradshaw intended for Lynn Swann in the Chargers' first round playoff win against the Pittsburgh Steelers, but the Chargers lost in the second round to the Miami Dolphins. Prior to the 1983 season, the Chargers traded Allen to the San Francisco 49ers for a draft pick, but Allen was cut during the preseason and never played for the 49ers.

References

Living people
1958 births
American football cornerbacks
Canadian football defensive backs
UC Davis Aggies football players
Miami Dolphins players
Toronto Argonauts players
BC Lions players
San Diego Chargers players
San Francisco 49ers players
Players of Canadian football from Indiana
Players of American football from Indiana
Sportspeople from Richmond, Indiana